Norman Reid may refer to:

Norman Reid (cricketer) (1890–1947), South African cricketer
Norman Reid (museum director) (1915–2007), director of the Tate gallery

See also
Norman Read (1931–1994), New Zealand racewalker
Reid (disambiguation) for other uses of the name
Read (surname), variant spelling